Karadagh rug or Karaja rug handmade in or near the village of Qarājeh (Karaja), in the Qareh Dāgh (Karadagh) region of Iran just south of the Azerbaijan border, northeast of Tabrīz.

See also
Heriz rug
Tabriz rug

References

External links
How To Look After a Persian Rug?

Persian rugs and carpets
Iranian culture
Ahar County